June Margaret Litman (13 March 1926–9 April 1991) was a New Zealand journalist. She was born in New Plymouth, Taranaki, New Zealand on 13 March 1926.

References

1926 births
1991 deaths
People from New Plymouth
New Zealand women journalists
20th-century New Zealand women writers
20th-century New Zealand writers
20th-century New Zealand journalists